Albion Roudolph Foster (24 November 1875 – 6 February 1945) was a Canadian farmer, policeman and politician. Foster was a Liberal party member of the House of Commons of Canada. He was born in Middle Simonds, New Brunswick in Carleton County and became a farmer.

Foster attended schools at Middle Simonds. He was also active in law enforcement as a deputy sheriff for eight years, a high sheriff for a decade and for five years a police chief for the Transcontinenal Railway.

He was acclaimed to Parliament at the Victoria—Carleton riding in a by-election on 16 June 1927 after a previous unsuccessful campaign there in the 1926 federal election. After serving for the remainder of the 16th Canadian Parliament, Foster lost to Benjamin Franklin Smith of the Conservatives in the 1930 election.

References

External links
 

1875 births
1945 deaths
Canadian farmers
Canadian police chiefs
Canadian sheriffs
Liberal Party of Canada MPs
Members of the House of Commons of Canada from New Brunswick
People from Carleton County, New Brunswick